We Used to Vacation is the fourth EP by the American indie rock band Cold War Kids. It was released by V2 on November 27, 2006 on compact disc and vinyl. The title track (which is also the opening track of Robbers & Cowards) is told from the perspective of an alcoholic family man, telling of his struggle against his alcoholism in order to be responsible to his family. The line "I give a check to tax deductible charity organizations" is from the Bob Dylan track "Ballad of a Thin Man", from his Highway 61 Revisited album.

Critical reception
NME were impressed by the track, praising the production and vocals and saying that the band had "enough flair, taste and soul for any educated heart in Britain."

Track listing

References

2006 EPs
Cold War Kids EPs
V2 Records EPs